The 2011–12 Horizon League men's basketball season marks the 32nd season of Horizon League basketball.

Preseason
In the preseason, Butler was the conference favorite despite returning only one of their top four scorers from the 2011 national runner-up team.  Butler received 28 first-place votes in the preseason poll of HL coaches, media, and sports information directors.  Detroit captured second in the preseason poll with 19 first-place votes, and Cleveland State finished third for the third consecutive preseason.  The preseason player of the year was Ray McCallum, Jr. of Detroit who was also named  to the John R. Wooden Award preseason candidate list.

HL Preseason Poll

Preseason All-Horizon

First Team
Ray McCallum, Jr., Detroit
Trevon Harmon, Cleveland State
Eli Holman, Detroit
Chase Simon, Detroit
Kaylon Williams, Milwaukee

Second Team
Tony Meier, Milwaukee
Alec Brown, Green Bay
Andrew Smith, Butler
Ben Averkamp, Loyola
Ryan Broekhoff, Valparaiso

Preseason Player of the Year 
Ray McCallum, Jr., Detroit

Conference Previews
Several media outlets projected the final Horizon League standings for the 2011–12 season:

Rankings

Schedule

Exhibition schedule

Non-conference schedule

|-
!colspan=12| November

|-
!colspan=12| December

|-
!colspan=12| January

|-
!colspan=12| February

Horizon vs. other conferences

Conference schedule

{{CBB schedule entry
| date         = Feb. 21
| time         = 8:00 pm
| nonconf      = 
| away         = 
| neutral      = 
| rank         = no
| opponent     = CSU at GRB''
| opprank      = 
| site_stadium = Resch Center
| site_cityst  = Green Bay, WI
| gamename     = 
| tv           = no
| score        = GRB Win71–67
| overtime     =
| record       = GRB 8–8CSU 10–6
| conference   = 
| attend       = 2,819
| highscorer   = Grady
| points       = 23
| highrebounder= Grady
| rebounds     = 8
| highassister = Sykes
| assists      = 4
}}

Conference Chart

Conference awards and honors

Weekly awardsHL Players of the Week'''
Throughout the conference season, the HL offices name a player of the week.

External links
HL Official website
Horizon League Network

References